("They [f.] move") is a French voluntary association created in 2005 in order to attract high school girls and young student women to careers in transportation engineering (aerospace, automotive, rail).

Purpose 
The association has the purpose to attract high school girls and young student women to careers in transportation engineering.

Governance 
The association was created in 2005 by Marie-Sophie Pawlak.

Members 
The association consists of natural persons (high school girls and women students in science and technology, women engineers or technicians in operation) and artificial person (companies, universities).

Business and federations

Higher education

Institutional 
 Ministry of the Economy, Finances and Industry
 Ministry of Social Affairs

References

External links 
 

Non-profit organizations based in France
Organizations established in 2005